Chaya Czernowin (Hebrew: חיה צ'רנובין, ; born December 7, 1957) is an Israeli American composer, and Walter Bigelow Rosen Professor of Music at Harvard University.

She is the lead composer at the Schloß Solitude Sommerakademie, a biannual international academy of composers and resident musicians at the landmark Schloß Solitude, in Stuttgart, Germany.
She is a 2011 Guggenheim Fellow.

Education and early career
Czernowin was born in Haifa, and raised in Israel. She studied in Israel, Germany, and in the United States. She also received fellowships to compose in Japan and in Germany. Czernowin studied at the Rubin Academy of music at Tel-Aviv University, Bard College, and received her PhD from the University of California, San Diego in 1993. At UCSD, she studied with Brian Ferneyhough and Roger Reynolds.

Czernowin spent several years after her formal studies on residencies and fellowships in Japan, Europe, and the United States. She was awarded the Ernst von Siemens Music Composers' Prize in 2003.

From 1997–2006, she was professor of composition at UCSD, and between 2006–2009 she was professor of composition at the University of Music and Performing Arts, Vienna.

Musical works

Early works
Dam Sheom Hachol

Operas
"opera without words," PNIMA...ins innere. (2000), premiered at the Munich Biennale
A companion to Mozart's fragment, Adama/Zäide (2006)
"Infinite Now" (2017), opera in six acts, premiered at the Vlaamse Opera in Ghent
Heart Chamber, 2019, premiered at the Deutsche Oper Berlin.

Source:

Orchestra
 Birds for string orchestra (1984), 11'
 The hour glass bleeds still for string orchestra (1992, rev. 2002)
 Amber for large orchestra (1993), 18'
 Afatsim for mixed ensemble (1996), 10'
 Shu Hai in an orchestral setting for orchestra, female voice, and live electronics (2001), 30'
 Dam Sheon Hachol (the hourglass bleeds still) version for string orchestra (2002), 19'
 Maim (strange water, stolen water), triptych for large orchestra, tubax recorded and a quintet of soloists (oboe, tubax, electric guitar, piano, viola) (2001/2002), 18'; 
 I: maim zarim maim gnuvim (strange water stolen water) (2002); 
 II: The memory of water (2006); 
 III: mei mechaa (water of disent) (2005-2006)

Ensemble
 Afatsim for mixed ensemble (1996). Appears twice (see orchestra)
 Winter Songs I: Pending Light for live electronics and seven instruments (2002/2003), 12'
 Winter Songs II: Stones for seven instruments and three percussionists (2003), 12'
 Winter Songs III: Roots for live electronics, seven instruments and three percussionists (2003), 14'
 Excavated Dialogues Fragments for a mixed ensemble of Eastern and Western instruments (2003), 8‘
 Excavated Dialogues Fragments – Second version for a mixed ensemble of modern and Renaissance/Baroque instruments (2003, rev. 2005)
 Anea Crystal for Two String Quartets and an Octet (2008)
 Sheva for seven players, for tpt b trb 2 percussionists pno contra guitar and vcl (2008)

Concerto
 While Liquid Amber for three amplified piccolos (solo) and large orchestra (2000), 18'

Chamber music
 Ina for bass flute and pre-recorded flutes (1989), 12' – ED 9680
 LeArye for violin and 15 pre-recorded violins and violas (1990), 14'
 Dam Sheon Hachol (the hourglass bleeds still) for string sextet (1992), 18' – ED 9663
 A map of a recurrent dream for sho, u, live and pre-recorded Tape (1994), 17'
 Tris for percussion and pre recorded percussion (1993), 13'
 Die Kreuzung for accordion, alt saxsophone and bass (1994), 10' – ED 9684
 String Quartet (1995), 14'
 Drift (Sahaf) for saxophone (baritone and sopranino) or clarinet (Eb clarinet and bass clarinet), E-guitar, piano and percussion (timpano, marimba, 2 plastic triangle liners, bamboo wind chime, ocean drum, ratchet, snare drum) (2008)

Vocal music
 Manoalchadiya for bass flute and two female voices (1988), 13'
 Shu Hai Mitamen Behatalat Kidon (Shu Hai Practices Javalin) for solo female voice and recorded nine voices with live electronics (1996/1997), 30' – ED 9672
 Six Miniatures and a Simultaneous Song for mixed ensemble and a singer (1998), 13'
 Pilgerfahrten for narrator, boy's choir, and instrumental ensemble (2005/2006, rev. 2007)

Recent works
Winter Songs, Maim Zarim, Main Gnuvim

Discography

Portrait CDs

References

Bibliography
 Gur, Golan. Czernowin, Chaya. In: Bayerisches Musiker-Lexikon Online..
 Seter, Ronit: Czernowin, Chaya. In: The New Grove Dictionary of Music and Musicians. vol. 6, 2nd. ed. Stanley Sadie, London 2001, pp. 823f.

External links
Art of the States: Chaya Czernowin two works by the composer
"Separate Universes Coexisting: Chaya Czernowin’s Musical Artistry," article in The Forward newspaper published October 20, 2010.
 (Crossroads)
Official website

Israeli composers
Israeli opera composers
Women classical composers
1957 births
Living people
People from Haifa
Tel Aviv University alumni
University of California, San Diego alumni
Bard College alumni
Harvard University faculty
Women opera composers
Ernst von Siemens Composers' Prize winners